Klaus Kathan (born January 7, 1977) is a German former professional ice hockey winger. He played in the Deutsche Eishockey Liga (DEL) for the Berlin Capitals, Star Bulls Rosenheim, Kassel Huskies, Adler Mannheim, DEG Metro Stars, Hannover Scorpions, EHC München in the during the 2012-13 season.

Playing career
Kathan began his career in 1994 for his hometown EC Bad Tölz of the 2nd Bundesliga. In his three seasons with the team, he played in 92 regular season games and scored 72 points including 43 goals, 24 of them coming in the 1995-96 season.

During the 1996-97 season, Kathan made his DEL debut for the Berlin Capitals, scoring seven goals in 23 games and also scored twice in the playoffs during the Capitals' series against local rivals the Eisbären Berlin, which they lost three games to one. In 1998, Kathan moved to the Star Bulls Rosenheim where he remained for two seasons, scoring a total of 34 goals. The Star Bulls however missed out on the playoffs in both seasons and despite surviving relegation in 2000, they withdrew from the DEL due to financial issues.

After Rosenheim's departure, Kathan moved to the Kassel Huskies, scoring 25 goals in his two seasons with the team and reaching the playoffs in both seasons, scoring three goals in each campaign. In 2002, he joined the Adler Mannheim, but his tenure with the team was hampered with injury and illness. In the first season for the team, he broke his wrist and in his second season, he suffered with meningitis. The setbacks contributed to a sharp decline in performance, scoring just four goals in his two seasons with Mannheim.

In 2004, Kathan joined the DEG Metro Stars where he bounced back into goal-scoring form. In the 2005-06 season, Kathan led the Metro Stars in goals with 28. The team also reached the playoff finals, losing to the Eisbären Berlin in three games. At the end of the 2007-08 season, Kathan's contract was not renewed at DEG, so he signed a contract with the Hannover Scorpions, winning a DEL championship with the team in 2010.

In 2011, Kathan moved to EHC München. On 14th of October 2012, Kathan became the fourth player, and first Bayer, to reach 900  DEL games. In 2013, Kathan returned to Bad Tölz, now known as Tölzer Löwen and playing in the Oberliga. The team were promoted to DEL2 for the 2017-2018 season, which would be Kathan's final season before retiring.

International career
Kathan played for the German national team in five Ice Hockey World Championships as well as the 2002 Winter Olympics. Kathan was the top scorer in the Olympic qualifiers in 2002.

Career statistics

Regular season and playoffs

International

References

External links
 

1977 births
Adler Mannheim players
EC Bad Tölz players
Berlin Capitals players
DEG Metro Stars players
EHC München players
Hannover Scorpions players
Kassel Huskies players
German ice hockey right wingers
Ice hockey players at the 2002 Winter Olympics
Living people
Olympic ice hockey players of Germany
People from Bad Tölz
Sportspeople from Upper Bavaria
Starbulls Rosenheim players